Pripyatsky National Park or Pripyat National Park in a natural reserve in Gomel Region, Belarus. It was founded in 1996 for preservation of natural landscapes around the Pripyat River from which it takes its name. Much of the park's area is occupied by turf swamps.

Flora and fauna 
Pripyatsky National Park is home to 51 species of mammals, including elk, wild boar, red deer, European badger, and Eurasian lynx.

See also 
Pinsk Marshes

References

National parks of Belarus
Protected areas established in 1996
Ramsar sites in Belarus
Central European mixed forests